When the Poppies Bloom Again is a 1975 Dutch drama film directed by Bert Haanstra. It is based on the book The Nail Behind the Wallpaper by Anton Koolhaas.

The film was entered into the 26th Berlin International Film Festival, but won no prizes. It was also selected as the Dutch entry for the Best Foreign Language Film at the 48th Academy Awards, but was not accepted as a nominee.

Cast
 Kees Brusse - Dr. Pulder
 Ton Lensink - Hans van Inge Liedaerd
 Dora van der Groen - Mrs. Mies
 Henny Orri - Lieske Pulder
 Karin Loeb - Kitty
 Manon Alving - Mevrouw van Inge Liedaerd
 Peter Römer - Kamiel Pulder
 Sacco van der Made - poelier Pronk
 Michel Fasbender - Receptionist

See also
 List of submissions to the 48th Academy Awards for Best Foreign Language Film
 List of Dutch submissions for the Academy Award for Best Foreign Language Film

References

External links 
 
 Interview with cinematographer Anton van Munster

1975 films
1970s Dutch-language films
1975 drama films
Films directed by Bert Haanstra
Dutch drama films